Beatrice of Savoy (before 4 March 1223 – 10 May before 1259) was a daughter of Amadeus IV, Count of Savoy and his first wife Marguerite of Burgundy.  She was a member of the House of Savoy by birth and by her first marriage she was Marchioness consort of Saluzzo.

Beatrice was the elder of two daughters; her younger sister Margaret was married to Boniface II, Marquess of Montferrat. After the death of their mother, their father married Cecile of Baux and had further children including Boniface, Count of Savoy and a younger Beatrice.

Beatrice was first betrothed not long after her birth on 4 March 1223 to Manfred III, Marquess of Saluzzo. However, the contract was broken off but was then renewed on 2 October 1227; a contract signed on that date refers to the dowry of Beatrice. The couple were married in March 1233. They were married for eleven years until Manfred's death in 1244, leaving Beatrice with two children and pregnant with twins. They had the following children:
Alice (c. 1236 – before 12 Jul 1311), married Edmund de Lacy, Baron of Pontefract and had issue
Thomas (1239–1296), succeeded Manfred as Marquess
Agnes (1245 – after 4 August 1265), married John, son of Eustace de Vesci, no issue
Margaret (born 1245), born posthumously, twin of Agnes

Only two years after Manfred's death on 8 May 1246, Beatrice was betrothed a second time to a Manfred, an illegitimate son of Frederick II, Holy Roman Emperor by his mistress and possibly wife Bianca Lancia. Her marriage was arranged to recognize an alliance between Beatrice's father and Frederick. The couple were married by proxy in March 1247 and the marriage contract was signed on 21 April 1247. Manfred and Beatrice had one daughter, Constance (1249-1302) who went on to marry Peter III of Aragon and became mother of Alfonso III of Aragon, James II of Aragon and Elizabeth of Aragon.

In a testament from Beatrice's father dated 24 May 1253, the succession rights of Beatrice were bypassed in favor of her younger half-brother; the testament fails to mention Beatrice's second husband, possibly indicating a breakdown in the marriage. Beatrice died before 1259. Her husband became King of Sicily in 1258 and went on to marry Helena Angelina Doukaina and father children with her.

References

House of Savoy
13th-century people from Savoy
Marchionesses of Saluzzo
Year of birth uncertain
13th-century Italian nobility
13th-century Italian women